Sphenomorphus louisiadensis is a species of skink. It is found in Papua New Guinea.

References

louisiadensis
Reptiles of Papua New Guinea
Reptiles described in 1903
Taxa named by George Albert Boulenger
Skinks of New Guinea